William Morice may refer to:

 William Morice (died 1554) (1500–1554), MP
 William Morice (Secretary of State) (1602–1676), English Secretary of State 1660–8, Member of Parliament for Devon, Newport (Cornwall) and Plymouth
 Sir William Morice, 1st Baronet (1628–1690), his eldest son, Member of Parliament for Newport 1689–1690
 William Morice  (1660-1688), eldest son of the 1st Baronet, Member of Parliament for Newport 1681–1688  	
 Sir William Morice, 3rd Baronet (1707–1750), Member of Parliament for Newport 1727–1734, and for Launceston 1734–1750
 William Morice (Archdeacon of Armagh)

See also
 William Maurice (disambiguation)
 William Morris (disambiguation)